Mohamed Miladi (born 18 August 1981) is a retired Tunisian football defender.

References

1981 births
Living people
Tunisian footballers
Tunisia international footballers
ES Zarzis players
Étoile Sportive du Sahel players
Association football defenders
Tunisian Ligue Professionnelle 1 players
People from Zarzis